Loch Fyne (meaning "Loch of the Vine/Wine"), is a sea loch off the Firth of Clyde and forms part of the coast of the Cowal peninsula. Located on the west coast of Argyll and Bute, Scotland. It is connected to the Sound of Jura by the Crinan Canal. Although there is no evidence that grapes have grown there, the title is probably honorific, indicating that the river,  (river Fyne), was a well-respected river.

In the north the terrain is mountainous, with the Arrochar Alps, Glen Shira, Glen Fyne, Glen Croe, Arrochar, Tyndrum and Loch Lomond nearby.

It is overlooked by the Tinkers' Heart, an old travellers' monument.  It was a place for weddings to traditionally take place.

Transport

Roads

The loch has several roads surrounding it.  The A83 goes round the head of the loch then travels down the west coast of Loch Fyne, from Ardrishaig to Tarbert along the Knapdale coast.  Leaving the A83 north of Cairndow the A815 travels down the east shore of Loch Fyne along the Cowal peninsula coast to Strachur, where to continue down the east shore the A886 leads to Newton.  Where you turn off onto the B8000 which carries on down the east shore to Millhouse, where you can go to Portavadie or Kames (direct) or via the Ardlamont peninsula, a longer route to Kames.

Ferries

At the mouth of Loch Fyne between Portavadie on the Cowal peninsula, on the east shore of the loch. A vehicle ferry traverses the loch to Tarbert on the Kintyre peninsula on the west shore.

Crinan Canal

The Crinan Canal connects Loch Fyne at Ardrishaig and the Sound of Jura at the hamlet of Crinan itself, giving a shortcut for smaller vessels out to the Hebrides saving the longer route of going around the Kintyre peninsula. The canal was built between 1794 and 1801 when the canal was opened, under the supervision of John Rennie. In 1816 Thomas Telford redesigned parts of the canal to remedy technical issues with water supplies for the canal.  There are fifteen locks along the canal's  length.

History

World War Two

During the Second World War, HMS Quebec (a shore establishment) also known as the "No 1" Combined Operations Training Centre (CTC) was centred a few miles south of Inveraray and used the shores of the Loch Fyne and surrounding coastline.  It trained personnel in the techniques involved in the use of landing craft and the setting up of a beachhead.  The No1 CTC was manned and trained personnel from all three services, Royal Navy, Royal Air Force and the Army, troops of the allies were also trained.  This important military facility was set up in October 1940, around 250,000 personnel passed through the training centre by 1944.  The main site is now occupied by Argyll Caravan Park.

Nature and conservation

Dolphins, seals and otters inhabit the loch, and basking sharks can appear in its waters during the summer months. A Ross's gull was present at the loch in early 2007.

In 2014 Loch Fyne was declared a Nature Conservation Marine Protected Area (NCMPA). The designation covers the entire loch northwards from a point near Otter Ferry.

Fisheries

Loch Fyne has a reputation for its oyster fishery, and as a consequence, the loch has given its name to the once locally owned Loch Fyne Oysters and to the associated Loch Fyne Restaurants. It is also notable for its herring-fishing industry, and hence the famous Loch Fyne Kipper, originally caught using the drift-net method. In the mid-19th century, Loch Fyne was the centre of the battle between the traditional drift-net fishermen and the new trawl-net fishermen who sprang up around Tarbert and Campbeltown in 1833.

Several Scottish sea-fishing records have been set in the loch:

Sport and leisure

Diving

Loch Fyne is a popular area for sport diving.  Off the coast at St Catherines, is a boulder field and a wrecked speedboat.  At Kenmore Point is Stallion Rock, a single rock that rises from the sea bed.

Sight seeing

Castles

It is also a popular tourist destination with attractions such as Inveraray Castle, Dunderave Castle, Kilmory Castle, Minard Castle and the nearby ruins of Castle MacEwen and Old Castle Lachlan around the shores of Loch Fyne.

Crarae Garden

Crarae Garden located 10 miles south of Inveraray, the National Trust gardens overlook Loch Fyne.

Inveraray Bell Tower 
The Loch is overlooked by the 126 feet (38 m) high Inverary Bell Tower, visible from much of the Loch, and is a popular tourist attraction.

Gallery

See also 

 Ardkinglas Railway
 Loch Fyne (Greenland), a ford named in 1823 by Douglas Clavering after this loch

References

External links

 Old Castle Lachlan - website
 Combined Operations, No 1 Combined Training Centre, Loch Fyne - website
 National Trust, Crarae garden - website

Fyne
Fyne
Firth of Clyde
Cowal
Underwater diving sites in Scotland
Nature Conservation Marine Protected Areas of Scotland